Pseudoreaster obtusangulus is a species of sea stars in the family Orestieridae. It is the sole species in the genus Pseudoreaster. It is found in the eastern Indian Ocean, on the west coast of Australia.

References

Oreasteridae
Monotypic echinoderm genera
Asteroidea genera
Fauna of the Indian Ocean
Marine fauna of Australia
Taxa named by Addison Emery Verrill